Aistrup is a Danish surname. Notable people with this name include:

 Nikola Aistrup (born 1987), Danish professional racing cyclist
 Sydney Aistrup (1909–1986), English footballer
 Christina Aistrup Hansen (born 1984), convicted Danish nurse 

Danish-language surnames